The World Trade Center (WTC) is a complex of skyscrapers at the corner of the / and the / in the Northern Quarter central business district of Brussels, Belgium. Its three towers are among the tallest buildings in Belgium.

The complex was originally planned to have eight towers, all around the corner of the Boulevard du roi Albert II and the Boulevard Simon Bolivar. The two of these at the south-eastern corner of the intersection became the Proximus Towers and the two at the north-east the North Galaxy Towers. Of the remaining four, two were built in the 1970s, one was built across the street in the 1980s, and the fourth was never built.

In response to the September 11, 2001 attacks on the United States, hundreds of Belgians formed a hand-in-hand human chain around the Trade Center in tribute.

Gallery

See also

 Astro Tower
 Finance Tower
 North Galaxy Towers
 Madou Plaza Tower
 Proximus Towers
 Rogier Tower

References

Buildings and structures in Brussels
Skyscraper office buildings in Belgium
Brussels
Office buildings completed in 1972
Office buildings completed in 1976
Office buildings completed in 1983